Write About Love is a 2019 Filipino romance film directed by Crisanto Aquino under TBA Studios which starred Miles Ocampo and Rocco Nacino. The film revolves around the collaboration of a young female writer and a veteran male indie film writer to complete an unfinished script for love story.

Cast
Miles Ocampo as Female Writer
Rocco Nacino as Male Writer
Yeng Constantino as Joyce
Joem Bascon as Marco

Release
Write About Love was released in the Philippines on December 25, 2019, as one of the eight official entries to the 2019 Metro Manila Film Festival. The film is TBA Studios third entry to the film festival with Bonifacio: Ang Unang Pangulo and Sunday Beauty Queen screened at the 2014 and 2016 editions respectively.

Reception

Accolades

References

External links
 

Philippine romance films
Films about filmmaking
2019 romance films